The Nubian spitting cobra or Egyptian spitting cobra (Naja nubiae) is a species of spitting cobra native to Africa.

Description
A relatively small spitting cobra. Maximum recorded length 148 cm. Colour and pattern: Brownish-grey overall, scale bases and skin between scales black. Belly slightly lighter. Dark band across nape, dark ring across throat and neck, usually an additional dark band on belly, bands may fade with age. Scalation: 207–226 ventrals, 58–72 subcaudals, 23–29 scale rows around neck, 23–27 scale rows at midbody, 1–2 preoculars, 6–8 supralabials.

Distribution
A scattered distribution in north-eastern Africa: Egypt (Nile Valley), Sudan (Nile Valley, Darfur), western Eritrea, Chad (Ennedi Plateau) and Niger (Aïr Mountains).

Taxonomy
It was previously confused with the red spitting cobra (Naja pallida), but was distinguished based on detailed morphological and mitochondrial DNA analysis.

References

Naja
Reptiles described in 2003